Dimitar Sakhanikov (born 16 September 1942) is a former Bulgarian basketball player. He competed in the men's tournament at the 1968 Summer Olympics.

References

1942 births
Living people
Bulgarian men's basketball players
Olympic basketball players of Bulgaria
Basketball players at the 1968 Summer Olympics
Sportspeople from Plovdiv